The 2021–22 North Caledonian Football League (known for sponsorship reasons as the Macleod & MacCallum North Caledonian League) was the 113th season of the North Caledonian Football League, and the first season as the sixth tier of the Scottish football pyramid system.

Invergordon won the league title for the sixth time, with a 1–0 victory over Orkney on 2 April 2022 securing an unassailable five-point lead over long-time league leaders Loch Ness, ahead of Loch Ness' final league game. Following a Scottish FA rule change in June 2020, champions Invergordon were awarded a place in the preliminary round of the 2022–23 Scottish Cup.

Teams

Stadia and locations

Withdrew 
Having withdrawn from the 2020–21 North Caledonian Football League, Bunillidh Thistle announced their intention to withdraw from the 2021–22 season as well, in June 2021. In the week leading up to the start of the season, Scourie also resigned their membership of the North Caledonian Football Association.

League table

Notes 
 Club with an SFA Licence (as of May 2021) eligible to participate in the Highland League play-off should they win the league.

References

External links 

 

North Caledonian Football League seasons
6
Sco